Selves We Cannot Forgive is the second full length album from American progressive death metal band Black Crown Initiate. The album was released on July 22, 2016 with eOne Music. It was produced by Carson Slovak and Grant McFarland(August Burns Red, Texas In July, From Ashes To New) and recorded at Atrium Audio Recording Studio's in Lancaster, Pennsylvania, with cover art by Travis Smith(Opeth, Devin Townsend, Avenged Sevenfold).

To date it is the band's strongest selling album, moving 1,825 copies in its debut week.

Background
This is the band's final album with long-time guitarist Rik Stelzpflug, who would depart the band shortly before the release of the album, though he would still receive co-writing credits on "Sorrowpsalm".

Replacing Stelzpflug was former The Faceless and Glass Casket guitarist Wes Hauch, who provided a guest solo on "Again". Though Hauch was pictured with the band before the album was released, he was only credited with the single guitar solo on the album.

Former Vale of Pnath guitarist Mikey Reeves provides a guest solo on "For Red Cloud" and "Transmit to Disconnect".

A music video for "Selves We Cannot Forgive" was released on July 25.

Track listing

Credits
Production and performance credits are adapted from the album liner notes.

Personnel
Black Crown Initiate
 James Dorton – Vocals
 Andy Thomas – Guitars, Vocals
 Nick Shaw – Bass
 Jesse Beahler – Drums

Additional musicians
 Grant McFarland, Sarah Thomas, Amanda Mellinger, Adam Biggs, Jeremy Graeff – Group Vocals on "Matriarch"
 Mikey Reeves – Guitar Solos on "For Red Cloud" and "Transmit to Disconnect"
 Travis Ryan – Vocals on "Transmit to Disconnect" 
 Wes Hauch – Guitar Solo on "Again"
 Grant McFarland – Cello on "Selves we Cannot Forgive", "Matriarch", and "Fallen Angel"
 Rik Stelzpflug – co-writer on Sorrowpsalm

Production
 Travis Smith – Artwork
 Sean Marlow – Design
 Paul Grosso – Creative Direction
 Alan Douches – Mastering
 Carson Slovak, Grant McFarland – Production

References 

Black Crown Initiate albums